Imasgho is a town in the Imasgho Department of Boulkiemdé Province in central western Burkina Faso. It is the capital of the Imasgho Department and has a population of 12,031.

References

Populated places in Boulkiemdé Province